Trauma Center is a 2019 American action thriller film directed by Matt Eskandari. The film stars Bruce Willis and Nicky Whelan.

Synopsis
In San Juan, Puerto Rico, Madison Taylor (Nicky Whelan) is injured when she's caught in the crossfire of two corrupt cops, Pierce (Tito Ortiz) and Tull (Texas Battle).

Madison wakes up in a hospital and as a witness of one of their vicious crimes, she’s placed under the protection of respected police lieutenant Steve Wakes (Bruce Willis). Madison's misfortune turns into a real nightmare when Pierce and Tull turn up to finish the job, realizing she is the key to tracing them back to the crime.

Trapped and hunted by Pierce and Tull inside the locked-down hospital, Madison desperately calls Wakes for help. But she must use her surroundings to fight back alone during this night of survival if there is any hope of making it out of the hospital alive.

Cast
 Nicky Whelan as Madison Taylor
 Bruce Willis as Lt. Steve Wakes
 Tito Ortiz as Det. Pierce
 Texas Battle as Sergeant Tull
 Lynn Gilmartin as Nurse Crystal
 Catherine Davis as Emily Taylor
 Lala Kent as Renee
 Sergio Rizzuto as Marcos
 Tyler Jon Olson as Det. Tony Martin
 Jesse Pruett as Customer Phil
 Steve Guttenberg as Dr. Jones
 Heather Johansen as Nurse Rachel

Box office
As of April 28, 2020, Trauma Center grossed $92,968 in the United Arab Emirates and Portugal.

References

External links
 
 
 

2019 films
American action thriller films
2019 action thriller films
2019 independent films
2010s English-language films
2010s Spanish-language films
Films directed by Matt Eskandari
Films set in hospitals
2010s American films